Bloodthirsty Butchers was a long-running indie rock and punk rock band from Sapporo, Hokkaidō, Japan. Although little-known in the West, they have contributed to two compilations on the Olympia, Washington based Yoyo label. The band has also released a split single with Rocket from the Crypt and a split EP with +/-. Japanese act Lost in Time named their band after a song from band's third album Lukewarm Wind. The long-term members are Hideki Yoshimura (vocals and guitar), Masahiro Komatsu (drums), and Takeshi Imoriya (bass). Former Number Girl member Hisako Tabuchi joined as an additional guitarist in 2003. 

Frontman Hideki Yoshimura also played guitar for other Japanese indie acts such as Copass Grinderz and Discharming Man.

On May 27, 2013, Hideki Yoshimura suddenly died of acute cardiac failure. He was 46. The band cancelled all the tour dates planned.

Members

Current members
  (born 20 January 1967, died 27 May 2013) - vocals, guitar (1986–2013)
  (born 31 March 1967) - bass (1986–2013)
  (born 7 May 1970) - drums (1989–2013)
  (born 9 December 1975) - guitar (2003–2013)

Former members
  - drums (1986–1989)

Discography

Albums
  (1988)
  (1989)
 Bloodthirsty Butchers (1990)
 I'm Standing Nowhere (1993)
 Lukewarm Wind (1994)
 Kocorono (1996)
 「△」Sankaku (1999)
  (1999)
 Yamane (2001)
  (2003)
 Green on Red (2003) (live album)
 Birdy (2004)
 Banging the Drum (2005)
  (2007)
  (2010)
  (2013)

Singles
 "Karasu" (1991)
 "Room" (1993)
  with Tadanobu Asano (1999)
 "Driwing" with El-Malo (1999)
  (1999)
 "Nagisanite" (2001)
 "Happy End" /  (2001)

Compilations
 Bloodthirsty Butchers (1996) (US release)
 Blue on Red (2003)
  (2012) (box set containing 12 CDs & 1 DVD)

Splits
 Bloodthirsty Butchers & Copass Grinderz (1994)
 Rocket from the Crypt & Bloodthirsty Butchers (1994)
 Bloodthirsty Butchers vs fOUL (1998)
 Bloodthirsty Butchers vs +/- {Plus/Minus} (2005)

Video
 Kocorono (2011) (documentary directed by Jun Kawaguchi)

References

Japanese punk rock groups
Japanese indie rock groups
Nippon Columbia artists
Musical groups from Hokkaido